The 2010 Minnesota Secretary of State election was held on Tuesday, November 2, 2010 to elect the Minnesota Secretary of State for a four-year term. Primary elections were held on August 10, 2010. Incumbent Mark Ritchie of the Minnesota Democratic–Farmer–Labor Party (DFL) won re-election to a second term.

Candidates

Democratic–Farmer–Labor Party
Incumbent Mark Ritchie won endorsement at the Minnesota Democratic–Farmer–Labor Party (DFL) convention. He faced only token opposition in his party's primary from perennial candidate Dick Franson, and easily won his party's nomination in the August 10, 2010 primary.

Republican Party
State Representative Dan Severson received the endorsement of the Republican Party of Minnesota at its state convention and was unchallenged in his party primary.

Independence Party
Jual Carlson filed at the last minute as an Independence Party of Minnesota candidate. As the only Independence candidate, he faced no opposition in the Independence primary. Carlson had previously sought office as a Republican.

Results

References

External links
 Minnesota Secretary of State - Elections & Voting

2010 Minnesota elections
Minnesota Secretary of State elections
Minnesota
November 2010 events in the United States